Simon Vermeiren (born 22 December 1990) is a Belgian professional footballer who plays for Lokeren-Temse.

References

External links

1990 births
Footballers from Flemish Brabant
Living people
Belgian footballers
Association football forwards
Oud-Heverlee Leuven players
K.S.K. Heist players
K Beerschot VA players
Lommel S.K. players
Lierse Kempenzonen players
Challenger Pro League players
Sportspeople from Leuven